George William Clarke (October 23, 1910 – October 9, 2000) was a lawyer and political figure in Newfoundland. He represented Carbonear in the Newfoundland and Labrador House of Assembly from 1956 to 1971.

He was born in Carbonear in 1910 and educated there, at Memorial University and at Mount Allison University. Clarke taught school from 1928 until 1941, when he joined the Meteorological Service of the Royal Canadian Air Force. He served as a magistrate from 1946 to 1956. Clarke was called to the Newfoundland bar in 1962 and practised law in St. John's. He was speaker for the Newfoundland Assembly from 1963 to 1971, when he retired from politics.

Clarke retired from the practice of law in 1981. He died in St. John's in 2000.

References 

Speakers of the Newfoundland and Labrador House of Assembly
1910 births
2000 deaths